Craven Heifer (1807–1812) was a cow which lived in the early 19th century, and to this day remains the largest cow ever shown in England: weight , length nose to tip of rump , height at the shoulder , thickest girth .

Craven Heifer was bred by the Reverend William Carr in 1807, on the Duke of Devonshire's estate at Bolton Abbey. She was so large that a special door twice as wide as the norm had to be built to get her in and out of the cowshed. This doorway can be seen on the estate to this day.

She was purchased by John Watkinson of Halton East for £200 (£10,000 in 2013 prices). Being such a notable creature, she was taken on tour, and attracted much attention wherever she went. She was taken to Smithfield in London; the journey from Wakefield to the capital took 73 days from 19 November to 30 January 1812, during which time she was shown at numerous towns and cities en route.

Despite the average life expectancy for domestic cattle of her breed being 15 years, Craven Heifer lived only five.

In January 2013 an oil painting portrait of Craven Heifer, dated 1811, sold for £16,250 ($25,586) at auction.

To this day, several public houses bear the name The Craven Heifer, particularly in the Craven district of North Yorkshire.

See also
Durham Ox

References

Individual cows
1807 animal births
1812 animal deaths
Individual animals in England
Craven District